This incomplete list of art critics enumerates persons who had or have a significant part of their known creative output in the form of art criticism, which consists mostly of the written discussion and aesthetic evaluation of works of art.

Scope

There is no official list of art critics, the compilation of which is compounded by problems in defining art criticism – not least of which is the overlap with art history, and philosophy of art. Herein will be included those authors that are mentioned as being art critics or producing art criticism in works of reference, as are encyclopedias, dictionaries or scholarly reviews.

According to one authority, art criticism, in a close approximation to the current sociocultural framework of the activity, started in the 18th century CE in Western Europe. However, many authors living before that time and outside that region of the world wrote on the subject of art and aesthetic experience, though using terms and concepts that may not have a direct translation into the lexicon of the Western tradition. These, when mentioned, will be included as well though pertinently noted.

A

Ansel Adams
Qadi Ahmad — pre-18th century, non-Western
Lawrence Alloway
Antigones of Karystos — pre-18th century
Guillaume Apollinaire
Pietro Aretino — pre-18th century
St. Augustine — pre-18th century
Albert Aurier

B

Robert Balmanno
Alfred H. Barr, Jr.
Iris Barry
Roland Barthes
Geoffrey Batchen
Charles Baudelaire
Germain Bazin
Monroe Beardsley
Samuel Beazley
Clive Bell
Walter Benjamin
John Berger
Heinz Berggruen
Olivier Berggruen
Oswell Blakeston
Franz Boas
André Breton
Osip Brik
Benjamin Buchloh
Victor Burgin

C

Charles Caffin
Dan Cameron
F. Lennox Campello
Maxime Du Camp
William Paulet Carey
Carl Gustav Carus
Fernando Castro
Germano Celant
Jean-François Chevrier
John Chandler
Henry Fothergill Chorley
Cynthia Chris
Robert Coates
Georges Cochet
Charles-Nicolas Cochin
A.D. Coleman
John Coplans
Douglas Crimp
Benedetto Croce
George Cumberland
Allan Cunningham

D

Richard Dagley
Arthur Danto
George Darley
Olivier Debroise
David Deitcher
John Dewey
Thomas Frognall Dibdin
Denis Diderot
Charles Wentworth Dilke
Regis Durand
Edward Dubois
Henry Bate Dudley
Edouard Dujardin 
Théodore Duret

E

John Eagles
Tomas Elsaesser
James Elmes
Hugo Erfurth
Walker Evans
Nissim Ezekiel

F

Sara Facio
Anna Fárova
Edmund Burke Feldman
Ernest Fenellosa
Carl Ludwig Fernow
Filarete — pre-18th century
Hal Fischer
Étienne La Font de Saint-Yenne
André Fontainas
Hal Foster (b. 1955)
Michael Fried
Michel Frizot
Roger Fry
Tatsuo Fukushima

G

Theóphile Gautier
Lorenzo Ghiberti — pre-18th century
André Gide
Antoine Joseph Gorsas
David Green
Clement Greenberg
Guo Hsi — pre-18th century, non-Western
Guo Ruoxu — pre-18th century, non-Western

H

Gustav Hartlaub
Sadakichi Hartmann
Benjamin Robert Haydon
William Hazlitt
Eleanor Heartney 
Dave Hickey
Prince Hoare
Fred Hoffman
John Hoppner 
Robert Hughes
Robert Hunt
Joris-Karl Huysmans

I

Amelia Ishmael

J

Ian Jeffrey
Jiri Jenícek
Edward Alden Jewell
William Jerdan
Daudet de Jossan
Donald Judd

K

Ilee Kaplan
Mary Kelly

Max Kozloff
Hilton Kramer
Rosalind Krauss
Barbara Kruger
Donald Kuspit

L

John Landseer
Lucia Lendelova
Claude Lévi-Strauss
Lucy Lippard
Lucian — pre-18th century
György Lukács

M

Janet Malcolm
André Malraux
Elizabeth McCausland
Edward Mayhew
Vijayakumar Menon
Ursula Meyer
Catherine Millet
Nikolay Alexandrovich Milyutin
Octave Mirbeau
Gilles Mora
Robert Morris
Thomas Munro

N

John Neal
Barnett Newman 
Friedrich Nietzsche
Bernard Noël

O

Jerzy Olek
Craig Owens

P

Walter Pater
José Pierre
Plato — pre-18th century
Nikolai Punin
William Henry Pyne

Q

R

Jasia Reichardt 
Antoine Renou
Pierre Restany
Jacques Rivière
John Hamilton Reynolds
Franz Roh
Barbara Rose
Jacqueline Rose
Harold Rosenberg
Robert Rosenblum
Martha Rosler
William Rubin
John Ruskin

S

Irving Sandler
Elaine Scarry
August Wilhelm von Schlegel
John Scott
Victor Serge
Michael Seuphor
William Sharp
Willoughby Sharp
Martin Archer Shee
Viktor Shklovsky
Ralph A. Smith
Robert Smithson
Rebecca Solnit
Abigail Solomon-Godeau
Susan Sontag
Jo Spence
Carol Squiers
Leo Steinberg
George Stanley
Wendy Steiner
Louis Stettner
John Szarkowski

T
Catherine Taft
John Taylor
Tériade
William Makepeace Thackeray
Theophilus — pre-18th century
Gene Thornton
Charles Traub
Sergei Tretyakov

U

V

Giorgio Vasari — pre-18th century
Marina Vaizey
Louis Vauxcelles 
Carl Van Vechten
Egon Vietta
Paul Virilio
Vitruvius — pre-18th century

W

Thomas Griffiths Wainewright
Walter Henry Watts
Francis Wey
Oscar Wilde
John Williams
Deborah Willis-Kennedy
Johann Joachim Winckelmann
Stanislaw Witkiewicz
Stanisław Ignacy Witkiewicz (Witkacy)
Wilhelm Worringer
Téodor de Wyzewa

X

Xenocrates of Sikyon — pre-18th century

Y

Yao Jui-Chung

Z

Marius de Zayas

See also

List of aestheticians
List of critics
List of painters
List of philosophers
List of sculptors

References

Criticism
Aesthetics
 
Art critics
Lists of visual art topics

de:Gottfried Knapp